The 2016 Toyota Owners 400 was a NASCAR Sprint Cup Series race held on April 24, 2016, at Richmond International Raceway in Richmond, Virginia. Contested over 400 laps on the 0.75 mile (1.2 km) asphalt short track, it was the ninth race of the 2016 NASCAR Sprint Cup Series season. Carl Edwards won the race, Kyle Busch finished second, and Jimmie Johnson, Kasey Kahne and Kevin Harvick rounded out the top-five. The race had 23 lead changes among different drivers and eight cautions over 29 laps.

Report

Background

Richmond International Raceway (RIR) is a 3/4-mile (1.2 km), D-shaped, asphalt race track located just outside Richmond, Virginia in Henrico County. It hosts the NASCAR Sprint Cup Series and Xfinity Series. Known as "America's premier short track", it formerly hosted a NASCAR Camping World Truck Series race, an IndyCar Series race, and two USAC sprint car races.

Entry list
The entry list for the Toyota Owners 400 was released on Monday, April 18 at 12:58 a.m. Eastern time. Forty-one cars are entered for the race.

First practice
The session was cut short by rain.

Qualifying

Kevin Harvick earned the pole for Sunday's race after rain washed out qualifying. He said afterwards that his team "had decided to come into the weekend and approach qualifying a little bit different, with just the way the race tracks have been and the timing of the practices. We decided to go and take advantage of being the first car on the race track, which is usually a big advantage here when the track is green and doesn't have a lot of rubber on it. It worked out today, and Rodney and everybody had a good plan, and it's going to be interesting just for the fact that, the second and third times out, the times weren't near what the first time was because the tires fall off -- which is great."

Joey Logano, who earned the second starting spot, said that he felt "like my team did a great job understanding the weather today before we hit the race track. We went out there and made our qualifying run off the truck and then focused in on race trim thinking that we weren’t going to qualifying anyway. The plan was executed perfectly besides second instead of first. Overall it is a good starting spot.”

Starting lineup

Final practice

Race

First half

Start

Under clear blue Virginia skies, Kevin Harvick led the field to the green flag at 1:16 p.m. After 15 laps, he pulled to seven-tenths of a second over Jimmie Johnson. By lap 20, however, Johnson reeled in Harvick and passed him on the outside going into turn 1 to take the lead on lap 21. After 10 laps, he pulled to a second and a quarter lead over Harvick. By lap 54, Carl Edwards pulled to within a quarter of a second of Johnson. After battling back and forth for nearly 10 laps, Edwards edged Johnson for the lead on lap 63. Johnson would pull back ahead to retake it the next lap. Edwards pulled ahead of Johnson the next lap to assume the lead. A number of teams began pitting on lap 85. Edwards pitted on lap 90 and handed the lead to Denny Hamlin. He pitted the next lap and handed the lead to Johnson. He pitted the next lap and handed the lead to Matt Kenseth. He pitted the next lap and the lead cycled back to Edwards.

Second quarter
After the first cycle of stops, Edwards led over Kyle Busch by two seconds. By lap 115, however, that lead had been cut by half a second. By lap 155. Busch pulled to within half a second of teammate Edwards. Debris on the backstretch brought out the first caution of the race on lap 157. Busch exited pit road with the race lead. Chris Buescher and Hamlin were tagged for an uncontrolled tire and restarted the race from the tail-end of the field.

The race restarted on lap 165. Edwards spun the tires on the restart and Busch pulled away. Edwards, however, reeled him back in and took back the lead on lap 169. Debris on the backstretch brought out the second caution of the race on lap 195.

Second half

Halfway
The race restarted on lap 203. By lap 231, Harvick reeled in and passed Edwards for the lead. After 15 laps, he pulled away to a two and three-quarter second lead over Edwards. Debris in turn 2 brought out the third caution of the race on lap 251. It came from the shredded tire of the No. 23 car of David Ragan.

The race restarted on lap 258. The fourth caution of the race flew on lap 268 for a single-car incident in turn 2. After cutting down his left-rear, Tony Stewart suffered a blowout and slowed down on the track. Brad Keselowski opted not to pit and assumed the lead.

The race restarted on lap 275. After going back and forth for three laps, Kurt Busch passed Keselowski for the lead. Brother Kyle passed him for the lead on lap 287. Debris in turns 1 and 2 brought out the fifth caution of the race with 88 laps to go. Kurt Busch exited pit road with the race lead.

Fourth quarter
The race restarted with 82 laps to go. The sixth caution of the race flew one lap later for a single-car spin in turn 4. Exiting the turn, Ryan Newman suffered a left-rear tire blowout and spun out.

The race restarted with 75 laps to go and the seventh caution of the race flew just after the restart for a spin by Ryan Ellis after being turned by Landon Cassill.

The race restarted with 66 to go. The eighth caution of the race flew with 42 laps to go for a single-car spin in turn 4 involving Brian Scott. Kyle Busch exited pit road with the race lead.

The race restarted with 36 laps to go. Rounding turn 4, Edwards bumped Busch out of the lead and scored the victory.

Post-race

Driver comments
Edwards said in victory lane that Kyle Busch is "an amazing teammate and it’s like he got really slow there at the end. Something happened that last lap. It was like his rear tires went off or something. He went down into (turn) one and I dove it in and I got to him and I thought, ‘Man, I’ve got something.’ And he went to get down to the bottom and park it in three and four and I had already decided to go down there so I thought, ‘Man, I’m going to give him a little nudge,’ and we both have got wins and we’re racing for fun getting these trophies and just an awesome day.”

“It's racing, I guess,” Busch said. “We had a really great car. We were fast - maybe not as good as Carl on the long run. The guys gave me everything we needed today. We lost it there on the second-to-last run, but we had a shot to win and that's all that matters."

Race results

Race summary
 Lead changes: 23 among different drivers
 Cautions/Laps: 8 for 29     
 Red flags: 0 
 Time of race: 3 hours, 5 minutes and 26 seconds
 Average speed:

Media

Television
Fox Sports covered their 16th race at the Richmond International Raceway. Mike Joy, two-time Richmond winner Jeff Gordon and six-time Richmond winner Darrell Waltrip had the call in the booth for the race. Jamie Little, Vince Welch and Matt Yocum handled the pit road duties for the television side.

Radio
MRN will have the radio call for the race which will also be simulcast on Sirius XM NASCAR Radio. Joe Moore, Jeff Striegle and six-time Richmond winner Rusty Wallace will call the race in the booth when the field is racing down the frontstretch. Mike Bagley will call the race from a platform inside the backstretch when the field is racing down the backstretch. Kim Coon, Alex Hayden and Steve Post will work pit road for the radio side.

Standings after the race

Drivers' Championship standings

Manufacturers' Championship standings

Note: Only the first 16 positions are included for the driver standings.. – Driver has clinched a Chase position.

Note

References

Toyota Owners 400
Toyota Owners 400
NASCAR races at Richmond Raceway
Toyota Owners 400